Leptothorax pacis is a species of ant in the genus Leptothorax. It is endemic to Switzerland.

References

pacis
Hymenoptera of Europe
Insects described in 1945
Endemic fauna of Switzerland
Taxonomy articles created by Polbot
Taxobox binomials not recognized by IUCN